Gerry Browne (born 9 December 1944) is a Trinidad and Tobago former footballer.

References

Washington Darts players
Miami Toros players
North American Soccer League (1968–1984) players
Expatriate soccer players in the United States
Trinidad and Tobago expatriate sportspeople in the United States
1944 births
Living people
Trinidad and Tobago footballers
Trinidad and Tobago expatriate footballers
Trinidad and Tobago international footballers
Association football forwards
Defence Force F.C. players
Pan American Games medalists in football
Pan American Games bronze medalists for Trinidad and Tobago
Footballers at the 1967 Pan American Games
Medalists at the 1967 Pan American Games